The 32nd Golden Bell Awards was held on 26 March 1997 at the Sun Yat-sen Memorial Hall in Taipei, Taiwan. The ceremony was broadcast by CTS.

Winners

References

1997
1997 in Taiwan